The Miami Marlins' 2015 season was the 23rd season for the Major League Baseball franchise, and the fourth as the "Miami" Marlins. They failed to make the playoffs for the 12th consecutive season.

Offseason

October 30: Rafael Furcal, Kevin Gregg, Reed Johnson, and Brad Penny become free agents.
 Gregg signed with the Cincinnati Reds.
 Penny signed with the Chicago White Sox.

Week of November 3: Signed 5 players to a minor league contract.

Week of November 12: Signed 4 players to a minor league contract and sent Kyle Jensen to the Los Angeles Dodgers for an unnamed players.

November 20: Promoted 5 players from the minors.

November 24: Signed Cole Gillespie to a minor league contract.

November 28: Received Aaron Crow from the Kansas City Royals for Brian Flynn and Reid Redman.

December 1: Signed James Leverton to a minor league contract.

December 2: Signed Chris Narveson to a minor league contract.

December 9: Invited 7 players to Spring training and signed Jhonatan Solano to a minor league contract and invited him to spring training.

December 10: Signed Issac Galloway to a minor league contract.

December 11: Drafted Andrew McKirahan and conducted these trades:
 Received Mat Latos from the Cincinnati Reds for Anthony DeSclafani and Chad Wallach.
 Received Andre Rienzo from the Chicago White Sox for Dan Jennings.
 Received Dee Gordon, Dan Haren, Miguel Rojas, and cash from the Los Angeles Dodgers for Andrew Heaney, Chris Hatcher, Enrique Hernandez, and Austin Barnes.

Week of December 15: Signed 5 players to a minor league contract and invited 1 of them to spring training. Also signed Michael Morse and conducted these trades:
 Received David Phelps and Martín Prado from the New York Yankees for Nathan Eovaldi, Garrett Jones, and Domingo German.
 Received Kendry Flores and Luis Castillo from the San Francisco Giants for Casey McGehee.

December 23: Claimed Preston Claiborne off waivers from the Yankees.

Week of January 2: Signed 5 players to a minor league contract and invited 3 of them to spring training.

Week of January 12: Signed 4 players to a minor league contract and invited 3 of them to spring training.

January 20: Signed 2 players to a minor league contract.

January 21: Invited 9 players to spring training.

January 22: Signed Tim Fedroff to a minor league contract.

January 27: Signed Ichiro Suzuki.

February 4: Sent Arquimedes Caminero to the Pittsburgh Pirates for cash.

Season standings

National League East

National League Wild Card

Record vs. opponents

Season summary
Playing against the St. Louis Cardinals at Busch Stadium on August 14, Ichiro Suzuki tied and passed a hits milestone.  Ichiro collected his 4,191st hit in top-level professional baseball off Cardinals starting pitcher Jaime García, matching Ty Cobb.  It was Suzuki's 2,913th hit in Major League Baseball, following 1,278 hits in nine seasons in the Nippon Professional Baseball league in Japan.  He passed Cobb the next night with two singles off John Lackey.

In popular culture
In the 1989 film Back to the Future Part II, a Major League Baseball team from Miami plays in the 2015 World Series, losing to the Chicago Cubs.  Although the city of Miami has created a professional baseball team since 1989, the 2015 team was in the National League and thus, could not have played the Cubs in the World Series.  The 2015 Chicago Cubs competed in the National League Championship Series.

Game log

|- style="background:#fbb;"
| 1 || April 6 || Braves || 1–2 || Teherán (1–0) || Álvarez (0–1) || Grilli (1) || 36,969 || 0–1
|- style="background:#fbb;"
| 2 || April 7 || Braves || 2–12 || Wood (1–0) || Latos (0–1) || — || 17,483 || 0–2
|- style="background:#fbb;"
| 3 || April 8 || Braves || 0–2 || Cunniff (1–0) || Koehler (0–1) || Grilli (2) || 16,127 || 0–3
|-  style="text-align:center; background:#bfb;"
| 4 || April 10 || Rays || 10–9(10)  || Morris (1–0)  || Boxberger (0–1)  || — || 17,375 || 1–3
|-  style="text-align:center; background:#fbb;"
| 5 || April 11 || Rays || 0–2 || Archer (1–1) || Cosart (0–1) || Boxberger (2) || 17,830  || 1–4 
|-  style="text-align:center; background:#fbb;"
| 6 || April 12 || Rays || 5–8 || Karns (1–1) || Álvarez (0–2) || Frieri (1) || 20,199 || 1–5
|-  style="text-align:center; background:#fbb;"
| 7 || April 13 || @ Braves  || 2–3 || Miller (1–0)  || Latos (0–2)  || Grilli (4) || 13,417 || 1–6
|-  style="text-align:center; background:#bfb;"
| 8 || April 14 || @ Braves  || 8–2 || Koehler (1–1) || Cahill (0–1) || — || 15,765 || 2–6
|-  style="text-align:center; background:#bfb;"
| 9 || April 15 || @ Braves  || 6–2 || Haren (1–0) || Stults (0–1) || — || 18,342 || 3–6
|-  style="text-align:center; background:#fbb;"
| 10 || April 16 || @ Mets || 5–7 || Blevins (1–0) || Dunn (0–1) || Familia (4) || 20,556 || 3–7
|-  style="text-align:center; background:#fbb;"
| 11 || April 17 || @ Mets || 1–4 || Colón (3–0) || Hand (0–1) || Familia (5) || 38,753 || 3–8
|-  style="text-align:center; background:#fbb;"
| 12 || April 18 || @ Mets || 4–5 || DeGrom (2–1) || Latos (0–3) || Torres (1) || 41,844 || 3–9
|-  style="text-align:center; background:#fbb;"
| 13 || April 19 || @ Mets || 6–7 || Harvey (3–0) || Koehler (1–2) || Familia (6) || 41,234 || 3–10
|-  style="text-align:center; background:#fbb;"
| 14 || April 21 || @ Phillies || 3–7 || Williams (1–1) || Haren (1–1) || — || 21,993 || 3–11
|-  style="text-align:center; background:#bfb;"
| 15 || April 22 || @ Phillies || 6–1 || Cosart (1–1) || García (1–1) || — || 23,417 || 4–11
|-  style="text-align:center; background:#bfb;"
| 16 || April 23 || @ Phillies || 9–1 || Phelps (1–0) || McGowan (1–1) || — || 17,097 || 5–11
|-  style="text-align:center; background:#bfb;"
| 17 || April 24 || Nationals || 3–2 || Morris (2–0) || Roark (0–2) || Cishek (1) || 16,259 || 6–11
|-  style="text-align:center; background:#bfb;"
| 18 || April 25 || Nationals || 8–0 || Koehler (2–2) || Strasburg (1–2) || — || 18,129 || 7–11
|-  style="text-align:center; background:#bfb;"
| 19 || April 26 || Nationals || 6–2 || Haren (2–1) || Gonzalez (1–2) || — || 21,433 || 8–11
|-  style="text-align:center; background:#fbb;"
| 20 || April 27  || Mets || 1–3 || Torres (1–0) || Cishek (0–1) || Familia (9) || 18,547 || 8–12
|-  style="text-align:center; background:#bfb;"
| 21 || April 28 || Mets || 4–3 || Morris (3–0)  || Torres (1–1)  || Cishek (2) || 17,255 || 9–12
|-  style="text-align:center; background:#bfb;"
| 22 || April 29 || Mets || 7–3 || Dyson (1–0) || Colón (4–1) || — || 17,076 || 10–12
|-

|-  style="text-align:center; background:#bfb;"
| 23 || May 1 || Phillies || 4–3 || Cishek (1–1) || Giles (1–1) || — || 18,511 || 11–12
|-  style="text-align:center; background:#bfb;"
| 24 || May 2 || Phillies || 7–0 || Haren (3–1) || Hamels (1–3) || — || 33,348 || 12–12
|-  style="text-align:center; background:#fbb;"
| 25 || May 3 || Phillies || 2–6 || González (1–1) || Cosart (1–2) || — || 20,461 || 12–13
|-  style="text-align:center; background:#fbb;"
| 26 || May 4 || @ Nationals || 4–6 || Grace (1–0) || Morris (3–1) || Roark (1) || 24,731 || 12–14
|-  style="text-align:center; background:#bfb;"
| 27 || May 5 || @ Nationals || 2–1 || Latos (1–3) || Strasburg (2–3) || Cishek (3) || 25,332 || 13–14
|-  style="text-align:center; background:#fbb;"
| 28 || May 6 || @ Nationals || 5–7 || Scherzer (2–3) || Koehler (2–3) || Storen (8) || 31,417 || 13–15
|-  style="text-align:center; background:#bfb;"
| 29 || May 7 || @ Giants || 7–2 || Haren (4–1) || Hudson (1–3) || — || 41,367 || 14–15
|-  style="text-align:center; background:#fbb;"
| 30 || May 8 || @ Giants || 0–6 || Lincecum (3–2) || Cosart (1–3) || Petit (1) || 41,413 || 14–16
|-  style="text-align:center; background:#bfb;"
| 31 || May 9 || @ Giants || 6–2 || Phelps (2–0) || Bumgarner (3–2) || — || 42,285 || 15–16
|-  style="text-align:center; background:#fbb;"
| 32 || May 10 || @ Giants || 2–3 || Casilla (4–0) || Cishek (1–2) || — || 41,889 || 15–17
|-  style="text-align:center; background:#fbb;"
| 33 || May 11 || @ Dodgers || 3–5 || Howell (2–1) || Cishek (1–3) || — || 44,941 || 15–18
|-  style="text-align:center; background:#fbb;"
| 34 || May 12 || @ Dodgers || 1–11 || Bolsinger (1–0) || Haren (4–2) || — || 49,628 || 15–19
|-  style="text-align:center; background:#bfb;"
| 35 || May 13 || @ Dodgers || 5–4 || Dyson (2–0) || Liberatore (0–1) || Ramos (1) || 38,316 || 16–19
|-  style="text-align:center; background:#fbb;"
| 36 || May 15 || Braves || 3–5 || Martin (2–2) || Dunn (0–2) || Grilli (10) || 18,334 || 16–20
|-  style="text-align:center; background:#fbb;"
| 37 || May 16 || Braves || 3–5 || Wood (2–2) || Latos (1–4) || Grilli (11) || 18,166 || 16–21
|-  style="text-align:center; background:#fbb;"
| 38 || May 17 || Braves || 0–6 || Miller (5–1) || Álvarez (0–3) || — || 23,075 || 16–22
|-  style="text-align:center; background:#fbb;"
| 39 || May 18 || Diamondbacks || 2–3 (13) || Reed (1–2) || Cishek (1–4) || Burgos (1) || 17,526 || 16–23
|-  style="text-align:center; background:#fbb;"
| 40 || May 19 || Diamondbacks || 2–4 || Hudson (1–1) || Dunn (0–3) || Burgos (2) || 16,034 || 16–24
|-  style="text-align:center; background:#fbb;"
| 41 || May 20 || Diamondbacks || 1–6 || Anderson (1–1) || Phelps (2–1) || — || 17,158 || 16–25
|-  style="text-align:center; background:#fbb;"
| 42 || May 21 || Diamondbacks || 6–7 || Chafin (2–0) || Dyson (2–1) || Ziegler (1) || 20,692 || 16–26
|-  style="text-align:center; background:#fbb;"
| 43 || May 22 || Orioles || 5–8 || Wilson (1–0) || Álvarez (0–4) || Britton (10) || 19,977 || 16–27
|-  style="text-align:center; background:#bfb;"
| 44 || May 23 || Orioles || 1–0 (13) || Capps (1–0) || McFarland (0–1) || — || 21,356 || 17–27
|-  style="text-align:center; background:#bfb;"
| 45 || May 24 || Orioles || 5–2 || Koehler (3–3) || González (5–3) || Ramos (2) || 23,834 || 18–27
|-  style="text-align:center; background:#fbb;"
| 46 || May 25 || @ Pirates || 2–4 || Morton (0–1) || Phelps (2–2) || Melancon (11) || 20,046 || 18–28
|-  style="text-align:center; background:#fbb;"
| 47 || May 26 || @ Pirates || 1–5 || Locke (3–2) || Urena (0–1) || — || 20,806 || 18–29
|-  style="text-align:center; background:#fbb;"
| 48 || May 27 || @ Pirates || 2–5 || Cole (7–2) || Dyson (2–2) || Melancon (12) || 33,238 || 18–30
|-  style="text-align:center; background:#bfb;"
| 49 || May 29 || @ Mets || 4–3 || Haren (5–2) || Harvey (5–3) || Ramos (3) || 33,880 || 19–30
|-  style="text-align:center; background:#bfb;"
| 50 || May 30 || @ Mets || 9–5 || Dunn (1–3) || Robles (0–1) || Ramos (4) || 39,095 || 20–30
|-  style="text-align:center; background:#fbb;"
| 51 || May 31 || @ Mets || 3–4 || Colón (8–3) || Cishek (1–5) || Familia (15) || 28,711 || 20–31
|-

|-  style="text-align:center; background:#fbb;"
| 52 || June 1 || Cubs || 1–5 || Hammel (4–2) || Urena (0–2) || — || 20,964 || 20–32
|-  style="text-align:center; background:#bfb;"
| 53 || June 2 || Cubs || 5–2 || Hand (1–1) || Hendricks (1–2) || Ramos (5) || 23,789 || 21–32
|-  style="text-align:center; background:#bfb;"
| 54 || June 3 || Cubs || 7–3 || Haren (6–2) || Lester (4–4) || — || 22,962 || 22–32
|-  style="text-align:center; background:#bfb;"
| 55 || June 5 || @ Rockies || 6–2 || Koehler (4–3) || Butler (3–6) || Ramos (6) || 32,091 || 23–32
|-  style="text-align:center; background:#fbb;"
| 56 || June 6 || @ Rockies || 5–10 || Rusin (2–0) || Phelps (2–3) || — || 30,373 || 23–33
|-  style="text-align:center; background:#bfb;"
| 57 || June 7 || @ Rockies || 3–2 (10) || Dyson (3–2) || Logan (0–2) || Ramos (7) || 35,139 || 24–33
|-  style="text-align:center; background:#fbb;"
| 58 || June 8 || @ Blue Jays || 3–11 || Estrada (3–3) || Hand (1–2) || — || 17,582 || 24–34
|-  style="text-align:center; background:#fbb;"
| 59 || June 9 || @ Blue Jays || 3–4 || Hendriks (2–0) || Ramos (0–1) || — || 20,558 || 24–35
|-  style="text-align:center; background:#fbb;"
| 60 || June 10 || @ Blue Jays || 2–7 || Copeland (1–0) || Koehler (4–4) || — || 44,106 || 24–36
|-  style="text-align:center; background:#bfb;"
| 61 || June 11 || Rockies || 6–0 || Phelps (3–3) || Rusin (2–1) || — || 18,003 || 25–36
|-  style="text-align:center; background:#bfb;"
| 62 || June 12 || Rockies || 5–1 || Urena (1–2) || Kendrick (2–8) || — || 20,355 || 26–36
|-  style="text-align:center; background:#bfb;"
| 63 || June 13 || Rockies || 4–1 || Latos (2–4) || Hale (2–1) || Ramos (8) || 26,647 || 27–36
|-  style="text-align:center; background:#fbb;"
| 64 || June 14 || Rockies || 1–4 || de la Rosa (4–2) || Haren (6–3) || Axford (12) || 20,879 || 27–37
|-  style="text-align:center; background:#bfb;"
| 65 || June 15 || Yankees || 2–1 || Koehler (5–4) || Tanaka (4–2) || Ramos (9) || 33,961 || 28–37
|-  style="text-align:center; background:#bfb;"
| 66 || June 16 || Yankees || 12–2 || Phelps (4–3) || Eovaldi (5–2) || — || 33,083 || 29–37
|-  style="text-align:center; background:#fbb;"
| 67 || June 17 || @ Yankees || 1–2 || Pineda (8–3) || Urena (1–3) || Betances (4) || 43,048 || 29–38
|-  style="text-align:center; background:#fbb;"
| 68 || June 18 || @ Yankees || 4–9 || Shreve (4–1) || Dunn (1–4) || — || 38,239 || 29–39
|-  style="text-align:center; background:#fbb;"
| 69 || June 19 || @ Reds || 0–5 || Leake (4–4) || Haren (6–4) || — || 33,379 || 29–40
|-  style="text-align:center; background:#bfb;"
| 70 || June 20 || @ Reds || 5–0 || Nicolino (1–0) || DeSclafani (5–5) || — || 36,755 || 30–40
|-  style="text-align:center; background:#fbb;"
| 71 || June 21 || @ Reds || 2–5 || Lorenzen (3–2) || Phelps (4–4) || Chapman (15) || 36,780 || 30–41
|-  style="text-align:center; background:#fbb;"
| 72 || June 23 || Cardinals || 3–4 || Martinez (8–3) || Dyson (3–3) || Rosenthal (22) || 21,759 || 30–42
|-  style="text-align:center; background:#fbb;"
| 73 || June 24 || Cardinals || 1–6 || García (3–3) || Latos (2–5) || — || 18,492 || 30–43
|-  style="text-align:center; background:#fbb;"
| 74 || June 25 || Cardinals || 1–5 || Lynn (5–4) || Haren (6–5) || — || 20,733 || 30–44
|-  style="text-align:center; background:#fbb;"
| 75 || June 26 || Dodgers || 1–7 || Anderson (4–4) || Nicolino (1–1) || — || 21,957 || 30–45
|-  style="text-align:center; background:#bfb;"
| 76 || June 27 || Dodgers || 3–2 || Koehler (6–4) || Kershaw (5–6) || Ramos (10) || 24,770 || 31–45
|-  style="text-align:center; background:#fbb;"
| 77 || June 28 || Dodgers || 0–2 || Greinke (6–2) || Urena (1–4) || Jansen (11) || 25,147 || 31–46
|- style="text-align:center; background:#bfb;"
| 78 || June 30 || Giants || 5–3 || Latos (3–5) || Vogelsong (6–6)  || Ramos (11)  || 19,711 || 32–46
|-

|- style="text-align:center; background:#bfb;"
| 79 || July 1 || Giants || 6–5 || Cishek (2–5)  || Casilla (4–2) || — || 19,341 || 33–46
|- style="text-align:center; background:#bfb;"
| 80 || July 2 || Giants || 5–4 || Fernández (1–0) || Cain (0–1) || Ramos (12) || 32,598 || 34–46
|- style="text-align:center; background:#bfb;"
| 81 || July 3 || @ Cubs || 2–1 || Koehler (7–4) || Hammel (5–4)  || Ramos (13)  || 41,212 || 35–46
|- style="text-align:center; background:#fbb;"
| 82 || July 4 || @ Cubs || 2–7 || Richard (1–0)  || Cosart (1–4)  || — || 37,898 || 35–47
|- style="text-align:center; background:#fbb;"
| 83 || July 5 || @ Cubs || 0–2 || Hendricks (4–4) || Latos (3–6)  || Motte (4) || 37,764 || 35–48
|- style="text-align:center; background:#fbb;"
| 84 || July 7 || @ Red Sox || 3–4 || Tazawa  (1–3) || Cishek (2–6)  || Uehara (20) || 36,863  || 35–49
|- style="text-align:center; background:#fbb;"
| 85 || July 8 || @ Red Sox || 3–6 || Porcello (5–9)  || Koehler  (7–5)  || Uehara (21)  || 37,009 || 35–50
|- style="text-align:center; background:#bfb;"
| 86 || July 9 || Reds || 2–0 || Fernández (2–0)  || Lorenzen (3–4) || Ramos (14)  || 25,027 || 36–50
|- style="text-align:center; background:#fbb;"
| 87 || July 10 || Reds || 0–1 || Leake (6–5)  || Phelps (4–5)  || Chapman (18) || 22,222 || 36–51
|- style="text-align:center; background:#bfb;"
| 88 || July 11 || Reds || 14–3 || Conley (1–0)  || Iglesias (1–2)   || — || 21,052  || 37–51
|- style="text-align:center; background:#bfb;"
| 89 || July 12 || Reds || 8–1 || Haren (7–5)  || Cueto (6–6)  || — || 23,842  || 38–51
|- style="text-align:center; background:#fbb;"
| 90 || July 17 || @ Phillies || 3–6 || Giles (4–2)  || Morris (3–2)  || — || 23,074 || 38–52
|- style="text-align:center; background:#fbb;"
| 91 || July 18 || @ Phillies || 1–3 || Billingsley (2–3)  || Koehler (7–6)   || Papelbon (15) || 23,655  || 38–53
|- style="text-align:center; background:#fbb;"
| 92 || July 19 || @ Phillies || 7–8 || Neris (1–0)  || Ramos (0–2)  || — || 21,739 || 38–54
|- style="text-align:center; background:#fbb;"
| 93 || July 20 || @ Diamondbacks || 1–3 || De La Rosa (7–5)  || Phelps (4–6)   || Ziegler (15) || 17,668  || 38–55
|- style="text-align:center; background:#bfb;"
| 94 || July 21 || @ Diamondbacks || 3–0 || Latos (4–6)   || Hellickson (6–6)  || Ramos (15) || 16,983  || 39–55
|- style="text-align:center; background:#bfb;"
| 95 || July 22 || @ Diamondbacks || 5–3 || Fernández (3–0)   || Ray (3–5)  || Ramos (16) || 15,857  || 40–55
|- style="text-align:center; background:#bfb;"
| 96 || July 23 || @ Padres || 4–0 || Koehler (8–6)  || Ross (6–8)  || — || 29,345  || 41–55
|- style="text-align:center; background:#fbb;"
| 97 || July 24 || @ Padres || 1–3 || Cashner (4–10)  || Haren (7–6)  || Kimbrel (27) || 25,897 || 41–56
|- style="text-align:center; background:#fbb;"
| 98 || July 25 || @ Padres || 1–3 || Kennedy (6–9) || Phelps (4–7) || Kimbrel (28) || 37,300 || 41–57 
|- style="text-align:center; background:#fbb;"
| 99 || July 26 || @ Padres || 2–3 || Despaigne (4–7) || Latos (4–7) || Kimbrel (29) || 33,292 || 41–58 
|- style="text-align:center; background:#bfb;"
| 100 || July 28 || Nationals ||  4–1 || Fernández (4–0) || Zimmermann (8–6) || Ramos (17) || 23,988 || 42–58
|- style="text-align:center; background:#fbb;"
| 101 || July 29 || Nationals || 2–7 || Fister (4–6) || Koehler (8–7) || || 19,513 || 42–59 
|- style="text-align:center; background:#fbb;"
| 102 || July 30 || Nationals || 0–1 || Scherzer (11–8) || Haren (7–7) || Papelbon (18) || 30,068 || 42–60 
|- style="text-align:center; background:#fbb;"
| 103 || July 31 || Padres || 8–3 || Maurer (7–3)  || Ramos (0–3)  || — || 19,582 || 42–61
|-

|- style="text-align:center; background:#fbb;"
| 104 || August 1 || Padres || 3–5 || Despaigne (5–7) || Urena (1–5) || Kimbrel (31) || 21,614 || 42–62
|- style="text-align:center; background:#bfb;"
| 105 || August 2 || Padres || 5–2 || Ramos (1–3) || Maurer (7–4) || — || 25,228 || 43–62
|- style="text-align:center; background:#fbb;"
| 106 || August 3 || Mets || 1–12 || Colón (10–10) || Koehler (8–8) || — || 23,119 || 43–63
|- style="text-align:center; background:#fbb;"
| 107 || August 4 || Mets || 1–5 || Niese (6–9) || Dunn (1–5) || — || 23,822 || 43–64
|- style="text-align:center; background:#fbb;"
| 108 || August 5 || Mets || 6–8 || Harvey (10–7) || Phelps (4–8) || Familia (29) || 25,897 || 43–65
|- style="text-align:center; background:#fbb;"
| 109 || August 6 || @ Braves || 8–9 || McKirahan (1–0) || Morris (3–3) || — || 18,548 || 43–66
|- style="text-align:center; background:#fbb;"
| 110 || August 7 || @ Braves || 3–6 || Detwiler (1–5) || Flores (0–1) || Vizcaíno (2) || 22,769 || 43-67
|- style="text-align:center; background:#fbb;"
| 111 || August 8 || @ Braves || 2–7 || Foltynewicz (4–3) || Koehler (8–9) || — || 42,544 || 43–68
|- style="text-align:center; background:#bfb;"
| 112 || August 9 || @ Braves || 4–1 || Hand (2–2) || Miller (5–9) || Ramos (18) || 24,610 || 44–68
|- style="text-align:center; background:#bfb;"
| 113 || August 11 || Red Sox || 5–4 || Morris (4–3) || Breslow (0–2) || — || 31,951 || 45–68
|- style="text-align:center; background:#bfb;"
| 114 || August 12 || Red Sox || 14–6 || Barraclough (1–0) || Rodriquez (6–5) || — || 26,041 || 46–68
|- style="text-align:center; background:#fbb;"
| 115 || August 14 || @ Cardinals || 1–3 || Vizcaíno (5–4) || Koehler (8–10) || Rosenthal (36) || 42,025 || 46–69
|- style="text-align:center; background:#fbb;"
| 116 || August 15 || @ Cardinals || 2–6 || Lackey (10–7) || Hand (2–3) || — || 44,706 || 46–70
|- style="text-align:center; background:#bfb;"
| 117 || August 16 || @ Cardinals || 6–4 || Narveson (1–0) || Martinez (12–5) || Ramos (19) || 43,826 || 47–70
|- style="text-align:center; background:#bfb;"
| 118 || August 17 || @ Brewers || 6–2 || Nicolino (2–1) || Garza (6–13) || — || 21,910 || 48–70
|- style="text-align:center; background:#bfb;"
| 119 || August 18 || @ Brewers || 9–6 || Flores (1–1) || Cravy (0–5) || Ramos (20) || 31,937 || 49–70
|- style="text-align:center; background:#fbb;"
| 120 || August 19 || @ Brewers || 7–8 || Peralta (4–7) || Koehler (8–11) || Rodríguez (30) || 30,453 || 49–71
|- style="text-align:center; background:#bfb;"
| 121 || August 20 || Phillies || 9–7 || Hand (3–3) || Williams (4–9) || Ramos (21) || 19,689 || 50–71
|- style="text-align:center; background:#fbb;"
| 122 || August 21 || Phillies || 1–7 || Eickhoff (1–0) || Flores (1–2)  || — || 19,391 || 50–72
|- style="text-align:center; background:#fbb;"
| 123 || August 22 || Phillies || 2–4 || Araújo (2–1) || Ramos (1–4) || Giles (9) || 22,113 || 50–73
|- style="text-align:center; background:#fbb;"
| 124 || August 23 || Phillies || 0–2 || Nola (4–1) || Conley (1–1) || Giles (10) || 22,693 || 50–74
|- style="text-align:center; background:#fbb;"
| 125 || August 24 || Pirates || 2–5 || Happ (6–7) || Koehler (8–12) || Melancon (40) || 17,644 || 50–75
|- style="text-align:center; background:#bfb;"
| 126 || August 25 || Pirates || 5–1 || Hand (4-3)  || Morton (8-5)  || Ramos (22) || 17,371 || 51–75
|- style="text-align:center; background:#fbb;"
| 127 || August 26 || Pirates || 2–7 || Locke (7-8)  || Narveson (1-1)  || — || 16,560 || 51–76
|- style="text-align:center; background:#fbb;"
| 128 || August 27 || Pirates || 1–2 || Cole (15-7)  || Nicolino (2-2)  || Melancon (41) || 19,950 || 51–77
|- style="text-align:center; background:#bfb;"
| 129 || August 28 || @ Nationals || 4–3 || Conley (2–1) || Scherzer (11–11) || Ramos (23) || 30,892 || 52–77
|- style="text-align:center; background:#fbb;"
| 130 || August 29 || @ Nationals || 1–5 || Zimmermann (11–8) || Koehler (8–13) || — || 31,519 || 52–78
|- style="text-align:center; background:#fbb;"
| 131 || August 30 || @ Nationals || 4–7 || Fister (5–7) || Hand (4–4) || Papelbon (22) || 34,488 || 52–79
|- style="text-align:center; background:#bfb;"
| 132 || August 31 || @ Braves || 4–0 || Narveson (2-1)  || Miller (5-12)  || — || 12,916  || 53–79
|-

|- style="text-align:center; background:#bfb;"
| 133 || September 1 || @ Braves || 7–1 || Nicolino (3-2)  || Banuelos (1-3)  || — || 16,386  || 54–79
|- style="text-align:center; background:#bfb;"
| 134 || September 2 || @ Braves || 7–3 || Conley (3-1) || Perez (4-6)  || — || 17,949 || 55–79
|- style="text-align:center; background:#bfb;"
| 135 || September 4 || Mets || 6–5 || Ellington (1-0)  || Goeddel (0-1)  || — || 24,763 || 56–79
|- style="text-align:center; background:#fbb;"
| 136 || September 5 || Mets || 0–7 || Colón (13-11)  || Hand (4-5)  || — || 23,135 || 56–80
|- style="text-align:center; background:#bfb;"
| 137 || September 6 || Mets || 4–3 || Ramos (2-4)  || Clippard (3-4)  || — || 26,780 || 57–80
|- style="text-align:center; background:#fbb;"
| 138 || September 7 || Brewers || 1–9 || Davies (1-0)  || Nicolino (3-3)  || — || 16,804 || 57–81
|- style="text-align:center; background:#bfb;"
| 139 || September 8 || Brewers || 6–4 || Barraclough (2-0)  || Jungmann (9-6)  || Ramos (24) || 14,958 || 58–81
|- style="text-align:center; background:#bfb;"
| 140 || September 9 || Brewers || 5–2 || Koehler (9-13)  || Cravy (0-6)  || Ramos (25) || 15,316 || 59–81
|- style="text-align:center; background:#bfb;"
| 141 || September 11 || Nationals || 2–1 || Dunn (2–5) || Janssen (1–5) || Ramos (26) || 17,167 || 60–81
|- style="text-align:center; background:#bfb;"
| 142 || September 12 || Nationals || 2–0 || Fernández (5–0) || Roark (4–5) || Ramos (27) || 20,235 || 61–81
|- style="text-align:center; background:#fbb;"
| 143 || September 13 || Nationals || 0–5 || Scherzer (12–11) || Hand (4–6) || — || 20,131 || 61–82
|- style="text-align:center; background:#fbb;"
| 144 || September 14 || @ Mets || 3–4 || Robles (4-2)  || Barraclough (2-1)  || Familia (41) || 27,320 || 61–83
|- style="text-align:center; background:#bfb;"
| 145 || September 15 || @ Mets || 9–3 || Koehler (10-13)  || deGrom (13-8)  || — || 25,633 || 62–83
|- style="text-align:center; background:#bfb;"
| 146 || September 16 || @ Mets || 6–0 || Conley (4-1)  || Colón (14-12)  || — || 25,161 || 63–83
|- style="text-align:center; background:#bfb;"
| 147 || September 17 || @ Nationals || 6–4 || Cosart (2–4) || Roark (4–6) || Ramos (28) || 23,606 || 64–83
|- style="text-align:center; background:#fbb;"
| 148 || September 18 || @ Nationals || 4–5 (10) || Janssen (2–5) || Ellington (1–1) || — || 27,495 || 64–84
|- style="text-align:center; background:#fbb;"
| 149 || September 19 || @ Nationals || 2–5 || Zimmermann (13–8) || Hand (4–7) || Papelbon (24) || 32,768 || 64–85
|- style="text-align:center; background:#fbb;"
| 150 || September 20 || @ Nationals || 3–13 || Strasburg (10–7) || Nicolino (3–4) || — || 28,444 || 64–86
|- style="text-align:center; background:#fbb;"
| 151 || September 22 || Phillies || 2–6 || Harang (6-15)  || Koehler (10-14)  || — || 16,742 || 64–87
|- style="text-align:center; background:#bfb;"
| 152 || September 23 || Phillies || 4–3 (11) || Ellington (2-1)  || Williams (4-12)  || — || 15,662 || 65–87
|- style="text-align:center; background:#bfb;"
| 153 || September 24 || Phillies || 1–0 || Morris (5-3)  || Asher (0-5)  || Ramos (29) || 17,083 || 66–87
|- style="text-align:center; background:#bfb;"
| 154 || September 25 || Braves || 12–11 || Fernández (6-0)  || Weber (0-2)  || Ramos (30) || 24,626 || 67–87
|- style="text-align:center; background:#bfb;"
| 155 || September 26 || Braves || 6–2 || Nicolino (4-4)  || Teherán (10-8)  || — || 24,449 || 68–87
|- style="text-align:center; background:#bfb;"
| 156 || September 27 || Braves || 9–5 || Koehler (11-14)  || Miller (5-17)  || — || 27,702 || 69–87
|- style="text-align:center; background:#fbb;"
| 157 || September 29 || @ Rays || 2–4 || Colomé (7-5)  || Morris (5-4)  || Boxberger (39) || 9,150 || 69–88
|- style="text-align:center; background:#fbb;"
| 158 || September 30 || @ Rays || 4–6 || Smyly (5-2)  || Cosart (2-5)  || Boxberger (40) || 9,431 || 69–89
|-

|- style="text-align:center; background:#fbb;"
| 159 || October 1 || @ Rays || 1–4 || Odorizzi (9-9)  || Fernández (6-1)  || Boxberger (41) || 9,657 || 69–90
|- style="text-align:center; background:#bfb;"
| 160 || October 3 || @ Phillies || 7–6 || Narveson (3-1)  || Giles (6-3)  || Ramos (31) || 16,240 || 70–90
|- style="text-align:center; background:#bfb;"
| 161 || October 3 || @ Phillies || 5–2 || Nicolino (5-4)  || Asher (0-6)  || Ramos (32) || 16,240 || 71–90
|- style="text-align:center; background:#fbb;"
| 162 || October 4 || @ Phillies || 2–7 || García (4-6)  || Rienzo (0-1)  || — || 21,734 || 71–91
|-

|- style="text-align:center;"
| Legend:       = Win       = Loss       = PostponementBold = Marlins team member

Roster

Statistics
Through October 4, 2015

Batting
Note: G = Games played; AB = At bats; R = Runs scored; H = Hits; 2B = Doubles; 3B = Triples; HR = Home runs; RBI = Runs batted in; BB = Base on balls; SO = Strikeouts; AVG = Batting average; SB = Stolen bases

Pitching
Note: W = Wins; L = Losses; ERA = Earned run average; G = Games pitched; GS = Games started; SV = Saves; IP = Innings pitched; H = Hits allowed; R = Runs allowed; ER = Earned runs allowed; HR = Home runs allowed; BB = Walks allowed; K = Strikeouts

Farm system

References

External links

2015 Miami Marlins season at Baseball Reference

Miami Marlins season
Miami Marlins
Miami Marlins seasons